This is a listing of all of the various versions of the soul music group The Impressions.

Jerry Butler & the Impressions

1958–1960
 Jerry Butler (singer)
 Curtis Mayfield
 Arthur Brooks (singer)
 Richard Brooks (singer)
 Sam Gooden

The Impressions

1960–1962
 Curtis Mayfield
 Arthur Brooks
 Richard Brooks
 Sam Gooden
 Fred Cash (a returning original member of the Impressions precursor group, The Roosters)

1962–1970

 Curtis Mayfield (The Brooks Brothers leave the group, reducing them to a trio.)
 Sam Gooden
 Fred Cash

1970–1973
 Leroy Hutson (Curtis Mayfield departs for a solo career)
 Sam Gooden
 Fred Cash

1973–1976
 Ralph Johnson (Leroy Hutson goes solo, replaced by Johnson and Torian)
 Reggie Torian
 Sam Gooden
 Fred Cash

1976–1980
 Nate Evans
 Reggie Torian
 Sam Gooden
 Fred Cash

1980–2018
 Reggie Torian
 Sam Gooden
 Fred Cash

Impressions